The Akron Cemetery is a historic cemetery in rural southeastern Independence County, Arkansas. With its oldest recorded burial dating to 1829, it is possibly the oldest cemetery in the county, and is known to be the burial site of some of the Newark area's earliest settlers. It is all that survives of the community of Big Bottom, and early settlement that was renamed Akron in 1880, and was abandoned around 1940.

The cemetery was listed on the National Register of Historic Places in 2002.

See also
 Walnut Grove Cemetery
 National Register of Historic Places listings in Independence County, Arkansas

References

External links
 

Cemeteries on the National Register of Historic Places in Arkansas
Cultural infrastructure completed in 1829
National Register of Historic Places in Independence County, Arkansas
1829 establishments in Arkansas Territory
Mounds in Arkansas
Cemeteries established in the 1820s